The Sigma DP3 Merrill is a high-end compact digital camera made by Sigma Corporation. It features a 46-megapixel Foveon X3 sensor (4704 × 3136 × 3 layers) and a 50mm f/2.8 fixed lens (75mm in 35mm equivalent focal length).

Software

Sigma Photo Pro 

Post-processing of RAW X3F and JPEG of all digital SIGMA cameras

Version 6.x  is free Download for Windows 7+ und Mac OS ab Version 10.7  (6.3.x). Actual Versions are 6.5.4 (Win 7+) and 6.5.5 (MacOSX 10.9+).

References

 http://www.dpreview.com/articles/2261907078/sigma-dp3-merrill-price-and-availability
 http://www.dpreview.com/articles/1431165397/sigma-dp3-merrill-foveon-75mm-equivalent

DP3 Merrill